Crummy may refer to:

A railroaders' slang term for a caboose
A loggers' term for the vehicle transporting loggers to the work site

People with the surname
Andrew Crummy (born 1959), Scottish artist
Helen Crummy, founder of The Craigmillar Festival Society